Democratic nominees for governor of Illinois:

Democratic-Republican/Adams/Jacksonian era 
1818 Shadrach Bond
1822 Edward Coles
1826 Ninian Edwards
1830 John Reynolds
1834 Joseph Duncan

Modern Democratic Party era 
1838 Thomas Carlin
1842 Thomas Ford
1846 Augustus C. French
1848 Augustus C. French,
1852 Joel Aldrich Matteson
1856 William Alexander Richardson
1860 James C. Allen
1864 James C. Robinson
1868 John R. Eden
1872 
1876 Lewis Steward
1880 Lyman Trumbull
1884 Carter H. Harrison, Sr.
1888 John M. Palmer 
1892 John Peter Altgeld
1896 John Peter Altgeld 
1900 Samuel Alschuler
1904 Lawrence B. Stringer
1908 Adlai E. Stevenson I
1912 Edward F. Dunne
1916 Edward F. Dunne 
1920 James Hamilton Lewis
1924 Norman L. Jones
1928 Floyd E. Thompson
1932 Henry Horner
1936 Henry Horner
1940 Harry Hershey
1944 Thomas J. Courtney
1948 Adlai E. Stevenson II
1952 Sherwood Dixon
1956 Richard B. Austin
1960 Otto Kerner, Jr.
1964 Otto Kerner, Jr.
1968 Samuel H. Shapiro 
1972 Daniel Walker
1976 Michael Howlett
1978 Michael Bakalis 
1982 Adlai E. Stevenson III
1986 ,
1990 Neil Hartigan
1994 Dawn Clark Netsch
1998 Glenn Poshard
2002 Rod Blagojevich
2006 Rod Blagojevich
2010 Pat Quinn
2014 Pat Quinn 
2018 J. B. Pritzker

Those in italics lost the general election.

Notes

Lists of Illinois politicians